Jarkovci is a village in Serbia. It is situated in the Inđija municipality, in the Srem District, Vojvodina province. The village has a Serb ethnic majority and its population numbering 604 people (2002 census).

Name
The name of the village in Serbian is plural.

See also
List of places in Serbia
List of cities, towns and villages in Vojvodina

Populated places in Syrmia